The Fusion Industry Association is a US-registered non-profit independent trade association for the international nuclear fusion industry. It is headquartered in Washington, D.C. It was founded in 2018 to advocate for policies to accelerate the arrival of fusion power. Its executive director is Andrew Holland, Chief Operating Officer of the American Security Project. The Fusion Industry Association has 28 members and 35 affiliate members, including nuclear reactor designers, engineering firms, suppliers, academic institutions, and various professional services with business in the nuclear fusion industry such as research consultancies. The emergence of the Fusion Industry Association can be traced back to the 2013 publication of a white paper on fusion energy by the American Security Project.

The Fusion Industry Association's stated advocacy objectives are to encourage private sector fusion companies' partnering with the public sector for applied fusion research, to increase financial support for the industry, and to ensure regulatory certainty. It is seen as one of the main drivers behind the development of Fusion Pilot Plants and supported the fusion energy public-private partnership amendment in H.R.133 - Consolidated Appropriations Act, 2021, which authorized $325 million over 5 years for the partnership program to build fusion demonstration facilities. The Fusion Industry Association has also played a role in the formation of the Congressional Fusion Caucus. 

Challenges facing the Fusion Industry Association include attracting the billions of dollars of funding necessary to create a commercial fusion power industry; improving the private sector's relationship with the public sector, including the world's largest fusion power science experiment, ITER; internationalizing a Global North-dominated energy development sector by bridging the North–south divide, and the credibility of some of its members.

See also 

Canadian Nuclear Association
Nuclear Energy Institute
Nuclear Industry Association
World Nuclear Association

References

External links 

 

Nuclear industry organizations